NGC 2169, is an open cluster in the Orion constellation. It was possibly discovered by Giovanni Batista Hodierna before 1654 and discovered by William Herschel on October 15, 1784. NGC 2169 is at a distance of about 3,600 light years away from Earth. It is nicknamed "The '37' Cluster" due to its striking resemblance to the numerals "37". The cluster is composed of components Collinder 38, a I3pn open cluster, and Collinder 83, a III3m open cluster.

References

External links 

SEDS entry

2169
Open clusters
Orion (constellation)